
Gmina Kozy is a rural gmina (administrative district) in Bielsko County, Silesian Voivodeship, in southern Poland.

Neighbouring gminas
Gmina Kozy is bordered by the city of Bielsko-Biała and by the gminas of Czernichów, Kęty, Porąbka, Wilamowice and Wilkowice.

Twin towns – sister cities

Gmina Kozy is twinned with:
 Hričovské Podhradie, Slovakia
 Jásztelek, Hungary
 Kenderes, Hungary
 Mošovce, Slovakia

References

Kozy
Bielsko County